Vânia Bastos (born May 13, 1956) is a Brazilian singer, who began her professional life with the Vanguarda Paulista avant-garde movement in the early 1980s.

Biography
Bastos moved to São Paulo in 1975, to study sociology and singing. In 1980, she began her career as vocalist of Arrigo Barnabé's Sabor de Veneno band. She was the main soloist of Barnabé's 1983 album Tubarões Voadores, and participated in presentations and recordings with Itamar Assumpção, the other important name of the Vanguarda. She also recorded with Brazilian rock bands such as Magazine and Joelho de Porco. From 1986, she began to record her own works.

Discography

References

External links
-Vânia Bastos in MPBNet

1956 births
Living people
People from Ourinhos
20th-century Brazilian women singers
20th-century Brazilian singers
Vanguarda Paulistana